The Italian colony of Italian East Africa was composed of six governorates which made up the first level of country subdivisions for the colony.

The governorates of Amhara, Galla-Sidamo, Harar and Scioa constituted the "Italian Empire of Ethiopia", which covered about half of the previous Ethiopian Empire. The Eritrea and Somalia Governorates were formed from the previously separate colonies of Italian Eritrea and Somaliland, enlarged with the remainder of Ethiopian territory. 

The governorates were divided into governor commissariats, governed by a governor commissioner assisted by a vice commissioner. The commissariats were divided into residences, sometimes divided into vice residences. The governor commissioners were usually also the owners of the residence with headquarters in the commissariats capital.

As a rule, the headquarters of the commissariats were provided with primary schools, post offices and telegraphs, infirmaries with a doctor, and runways for airplanes. The residences were equipped with a post office, telegraph and infirmary with a doctor.

List of governorates

External links
 Modern Ethiopian Monarchs Part Seven

See also
 Italian East Africa
 List of governors-general of Italian East Africa
 List of governors of the governorates of Italian East Africa

References

 
Italian East Africa